Taking Woodstock is a 2009 American historical musical comedy-drama film about the Woodstock Festival of 1969, directed by Ang Lee. The screenplay by James Schamus is based on the memoir Taking Woodstock: A True Story of a Riot, a Concert, and a Life by Elliot Tiber and Tom Monte.

The film premiered at the 2009 Cannes Film Festival, and opened in New York and Los Angeles on August 26, 2009, before its wide theatrical release two days later. It received mixed reviews and was a box office failure.

Plot
Set in 1969, the film is based on the true story of Elliot Tiber (Demetri Martin), an aspiring Greenwich Village interior designer whose parents, Jake (Henry Goodman) and Sonia (Imelda Staunton), own the small dilapidated El Monaco Resort in White Lake, in the town of Bethel, New York. A hippie theater troupe, The Earthlight Players, rents the barn, but can hardly pay any rent. Due to financial trouble, the motel may have to be closed, but Elliot pleads with the local bank not to foreclose on the mortgage and Sonia delivers a tirade about her struggles as a Russian refugee. The family is given until the end of the summer to pay up.

Elliot plans to hold a small musical festival, and has, for $1, obtained a permit from the town's chamber of commerce (of which he is also the president). When he hears that the organizers of the Woodstock Festival face opposition against the originally planned location, he offers his permit and the motel accommodations to organizer Michael Lang (Jonathan Groff). A neighbor, Max Yasgur (Eugene Levy), provides his nearby farm land; first they agree on a fee of $5,000, but after realizing how many people will come, Yasgur demands $75,000, which the organizers reluctantly accept. Elliot comes to agreement about the fee for the motel more smoothly. Initial objections by his mother quickly disappear when she sees the cash paid in advance.

Elliot and Yasgur encounter a little bit of expected opposition. The local diner refuses to serve Elliot anymore, inspectors target the motel (and only his) for building code violations, and some local boys paint a swastika and hate words on the motel. However, resistance quickly dissolves in the tidal wave of peace and love (and commerce) brought to the area. The Tiber family works hard serving the massive influx of visitors and become wealthy in the process. A cross-dressing veteran, Vilma (Liev Schreiber), is hired as a security guard. Elliot also struggles with hiding his homosexuality from his family, when he connects romantically with one of the event organizers staying at the motel.

On the first day of the concert, Elliot, his father, and Vilma hear the music begin in the distance. Elliot's father, transformed and enlivened by all the new life in town, tells Elliot to go and see the concert. Elliot hitches a ride through the peaceful traffic jam on the back of a benevolent state trooper's motorcycle and arrives at the event. There, he meets a hippie couple (Paul Dano and Kelli Garner), who invite him to join them on an LSD trip in their VW Bus a short distance from the crowd. Elliot has trouble relaxing at first, but gradually melts into a psychedelic union with them. When they finally emerge after sundown, Elliot watches the vast crowd and brilliant lights of the distant concert ripple with harmonious hallucinatory visuals that swell into serene white light.

Elliot returns home from his liberating experience and has breakfast with his parents. He suggests to his mother that they now have enough money to replace him, but she cannot bear to let him have his freedom. Elliot storms out, facetiously suggesting his mom eat the hash brownies Vilma has just offered. After another beautiful day at the festival, during which his friend the Vietnam veteran, Billy (Emile Hirsch), appears to overcome his post-traumatic stress disorder, Elliot returns home to find his parents laughing and cavorting hysterically, having eaten Vilma's hash brownies. The once-brittle family (particularly Sonia) is united in joy and delirious affection.

The next morning, however, Sonia inadvertently reveals that she has secretly saved $97,000 in cash in the floorboards of her closet. Elliot is upset that his mother hid this from him while he put his own savings into helping his parents.

After the final day of the concert, Elliot decides to move to California as he packs up his things and says farewell to his father, after his father encourages him to strike out on his own. As Elliot pays one last visit to the concert and looks out over the muddy desolation of the Yasgur farm, Lang rides up on horseback and they marvel at how despite the obstacles, the event was a success. Lang mentions his next big project: staging a truly free concert in San Francisco with the Rolling Stones.

Cast

 Demetri Martin as Elliot Teichberg/Tiber, who volunteered his family's motel to be the home base for Woodstock concert organizers which would take place on a nearby farm
 Imelda Staunton as Sonia Teichberg
 Henry Goodman as Jake Teichberg
 Liev Schreiber as Betty von Vilma, hired security.
 Jonathan Groff as Woodstock organizer Michael Lang
 Eugene Levy as Max Yasgur, who owns the nearby farm
 Emile Hirsch as Billy, a recently returned Vietnam vet
 Paul Dano and Kelli Garner as a hippie couple in a VW attending the concert
 Jeffrey Dean Morgan as Dan, Billy's brother and in opposition to the festival
 Adam Pally as festival co-organizer Artie Kornfeld
 Mamie Gummer as Tisha, Lang's assistant
 Dan Fogler as Devon, a local theater troupe head
 Skylar Astin as John P. Roberts, who bankrolled the Festival and co-organizer of Woodstock
 Adam LeFevre as Dave
 Richard Thomas as Reverend Don
 Kevin Chamberlin as Jackson Spiers
 Darren Pettie as Paul, the construction worker Elliot is attracted to
 Katherine Waterston as Penny
 Sondra James as Margaret
 Damian Kulash (uncredited) as a guitar-playing hippie

Production
Principal photography took place from August to October 2008 in New Lebanon, New York and East Chatham, New York, located in Columbia County, New York.

Factual accuracy

Michael Lang has disputed Tiber's account of the initial meeting with Max Yasgur, and said that he was introduced to Yasgur by a real estate salesman. Lang says that the salesman drove him, without Tiber, to Yasgur's farm. Sam Yasgur, son of Max, agrees with Lang's version, and says that his mother, who is still alive, says Max did not know Tiber. Artie Kornfeld, a Woodstock organizer, has said he found out about Yasgur's farm from his own sources.

Release

Box office
Taking Woodstock grossed $3,457,760 during its opening weekend, opening at #9. After five and a half weeks in theaters, on October 1, 2009, the film's total domestic box office gross was $7,460,204 with an overseas take of $2,515,533. The film grossed $9,975,737 worldwide, thus making the film, from an estimated $30 million budget, a box office bomb.

Critical reaction
The film maintains a 48% average on Rotten Tomatoes based on 179 reviews for an average rating of 5.4/10. The site's consensus states: "Featuring numerous 60s-era clichés, but little of the musical magic that highlighted the famous festival, Taking Woodstock is a breezy but underwhelming portrayal." and a 55% on Metacritic.

Roger Ebert at the Chicago Sun-Times wrote: "... Lee and writer James Schamus aren't making a historical pastiche. This is a comedy with some sweet interludes and others that are cheerfully over the top, such as a nude theatrical troupe living in Elliot’s barn, and Vilma, his volunteer head of motel security, a transvestite ex-Marine played by Liev Schreiber. How does Schreiber, looking just as he usually does except for a blond wig and a dress, play a transvestite? Completely straight. It works."

Michael Phillips at the Chicago Tribune gave it 3 out 4 stars saying "Screenwriter James Schamus doesn’t do anything as stupid as shove Elliot back in the closet, but this is no Brokeback Catskills Mountain. It’s a mosaic – many characters, drifting in and out of focus – stitching the story of how the peace-and-music bash fell together as it bounced in the haphazard planning stages from its originally scheduled Wallkill, New York, location to a cow pasture in White Lake. (Eugene Levy, working hard to restrain his natural comic ebullience, plays the dairy farmer, Max Yasgur.)"

Stephen Holden at The New York Times liked the film, which he described as a "likable, humane movie" and "a small, intimate film into which is fitted a peripheral view of the landmark event". He pointed out that "Taking Woodstock pointedly shies away from spectacle, the better to focus on how the lives of individuals caught up by history are transformed ...the movie explicitly connects Woodstock to the gay-liberation movement and the Stonewall riots, which took place two months earlier that summer."

Lou Lumeneck at the New York Post gave it 1.5 stars: "It turns the fabled music festival, a key cultural moment of the late 20th century, into an exceedingly lame, heavily clichéd, thumb-sucking bore. There are two main problems with Taking Woodstock. One is the central nonperformance by the stand-up comedian Demetri Martin, who is pretty much an emotional black hole as Elliot ... the movie doesn't make much of an issue of the character's gayness—which is utterly untrue to the period, 1969, even in enlightened circles."

Melissa Anderson in The Village Voice wrote: "Ang Lee’s facile Taking Woodstock proves that the decade is still prone to the laziest, wide-eyed oversimplifications ... little music from the concert itself is heard. On display instead are inane, occasionally borderline offensive portrayals of Jews, performance artists, trannies, Vietnam vets, squares, and freaks."

Slate wrote: "After the long middle section building up to the actual Woodstock, the movie's treatment of the event is maddeningly indirect. No one's asking for a song-by-song re-enactment of the concert, but Lee's refusal to focus even for a moment on the musical aspect of the festival starts to feel almost perverse, as if he's deliberately frustrating the audience's desire."

Awards and nominations
Taking Woodstock lost when it was nominated for the GLAAD Media Award for "Outstanding Film – Wide Release" during the 21st GLAAD Media Awards to A Single Man.

Home media
The DVD and Blu-ray were released on December 15, 2009. Special features include an audio commentary with director Ang Lee and writer/producer James Schamus, deleted scenes, and a featurette: Peace, Love, and Cinema. The Blu-ray features all the DVD features with additional deleted scenes, and another featurette: No Audience Required – The Earthlight Players.

See also
 Woodstock, a 1970 concert film

References

External links
 
 
 
 
 

Woodstock Festival
2009 films
2000s political comedy-drama films
2009 LGBT-related films
American political comedy-drama films
American LGBT-related films
2000s English-language films
Films about hallucinogens
Films directed by Ang Lee
Comedy-drama films based on actual events
Films produced by James Schamus
Films scored by Danny Elfman
Films based on memoirs
Films set in the 1960s
Films set in 1969
Films set in motels
Films set in New York (state)
Films shot in New York (state)
Films shot in New York City
Hippie films
Films with screenplays by James Schamus
Focus Features films
2000s American films